The Stanford Cardinal men's basketball team represents Stanford University in Stanford, California, United States. The school's team currently competes in the Pac-12 Conference. They are coached by Jerod Haase and play their home games at Maples Pavilion.

Stanford began varsity intercollegiate competition in men's basketball in 1914. The Cardinal have won 13 conference championships (8 in the PCC and 5 in the Pac-10), the last in 2004, and one NCAA championship, in 1942. Stanford was also retroactively recognized as the pre-NCAA tournament national champion for the 1936–37 season by the Premo-Porretta Power Poll and the Helms Athletic Foundation. The team last played in the NCAA tournament in 2014.

Seasons

Postseason results

NCAA tournament results
The Cardinal have appeared in 17 NCAA Tournaments, with a combined record of 23–16. They were national champions in 1942, but did not return for 47 years, until 1989.

NIT results
The Cardinal have appeared in nine National Invitation Tournaments (NIT), with a combined record of 19–6. They are three time NIT champions (1991, 2012, 2015).

 Conference rules (PCC/Pac-8) disallowed participation until 1973.

CBI results
The Cardinal have appeared in one College Basketball Invitational (CBI). Their record is 2–1.

Record vs. Pac-12 opponents

Notable players

Bob Bedell (born 1944), basketball player in the ABA from 1967-1971.
Mike Bratz (born 1955), basketball player in the NBA from 1977-1986.
Curtis Borchardt (born 1980), basketball player in the NBA from 2003-2012.
Anthony Brown (born 1992), basketball player in the NBA, and now in the Israeli Basketball Premier League
Greg Butler (born 1966), basketball player in the NBA from 1988-1991.
Josh Childress (born 1983), basketball player in the NBA from 2004-2008 and 2010-2013 then played in the EuroLeague from 2008-10.
Jarron Collins (born 1978), basketball player in the NBA from 2001-2011. He has been an assistant coach in the NBA since 2014.
Jason Collins (born 1978), basketball player in the NBA from 2001-2014.
Landry Fields (born 1988), basketball player in the NBA from 2010-2015. He has been a general manager since 2022.
Josh Huestis (born 1991), basketball player in the NBA from 2015-2018
Casey Jacobsen (born 1981), basketball player in the NBA from 2003-2005 and 2007-2008. Also spent time in the EuroLeague.
Robin Lopez (born 1988), basketball player in the NBA from 2008-Present.
Brook Lopez (born 1988), basketball player in the NBA from 2008-present. All-star and NBA champion.

References

External links